The 1939 Colorado Mines Orediggers football team was an American football team that represented the Colorado School of Mines in the Rocky Mountain Conference (RMC) during the 1939 college football season. In their third year under head coach John Mason, the Orediggers compiled a perfect 8–0 record, outscored opponents by a total of 268 to 44, and won the RMC championship.

Colorado Mines wingback Lloyd Madden won the national scoring title with 141 points scored (23 touchdowns and three extra points). He broke the RMC scoring record set in 1937 by Byron White. He was selected by the Chicago Cardinals with the 16th overall pick in the 1940 NFL Draft.

Colorado Mines secured eight of eleven first-team spots on the Associated Press All-Rocky Mountain Conference football team. Six were also given first-team conference honors by the United Press. The first-team honorees were: backs Madden (AP-1, UP-1), Joe Berta (AP-1), Jacky Torpey (AP-1, UP-1), and Taylor (UP-1); end Rex Flynn (AP-1, UP-1); tackles Marv Katzenstein (AP-1, UP-1) and Dick Moe (AP-1, UP-1); guard Dave Geiskieng (AP-1, UP-1); and center Herbert Thornton (AP-1).

Schedule

References

Colorado Mines
Colorado Mines Orediggers football seasons
Rocky Mountain Athletic Conference football champion seasons
College football undefeated seasons
Colorado Mines Orediggers football